Hometown News was an American country music duo composed of singer-songwriters Ron Kingery and Scott Whitehead, both of whom were vocalists and guitarists. Hometown News has recorded two independently released albums, in addition to charting two singles on the Billboard country music charts. Their highest-peaking single, "Minivan", reached No. 37 in 2002.

History
Before the duo's formation, Ron Kingery worked as a studio engineer for various country music artists in Nashville, Tennessee, in addition to writing children's music. Scott Whitehead, a graduate of the University of Tennessee at Martin and formerly a pilot for the United States Navy, was also working a songwriter in Nashville, when he met Kingery at a songwriter's workshop in 1996. In addition, the duo appeared on the Grand Ole Opry, as well as playing gigs at several military bases.

Recording career
The duo were then signed to VFR Records in 2002, recording their album Wheels that year. The album produced two singles in its title track and "Minivan", the latter a Top 40 hit. Shortly afterward, the duo embarked on a tour of the United States, sponsored by the Ford Motor Company.<ref>{{cite web |url=http://www.theautochannel.com/news/2002/02/21/036106.html |title="Hometown News" Sets Off On Minivan PromotionalTour |accessdate=2007-07-22 |work=The Auto Channel.com}}</ref> VFR closed in 2002, however, and the duo was left without a record deal.

Hometown News sang "The Star-Spangled Banner" and "God Bless America" at game six of the 2004 National League Championship Series at Busch Stadium in St. Louis, Missouri.

In 2005, Hometown News signed to the independent Quarterback Records label. Their second album, Hometown News'', was released in 2006, although it did not produce any  chart singles.

Whitehead died on March 12, 2021, of unknown causes.

Discography

Studio albums

Singles

Music videos

References

Country music groups from Tennessee
Country music duos
Musical groups established in 2002
2002 establishments in Tennessee
Musical groups disestablished in 2008